A list of films produced in Argentina in 1936:

References

1936
Films
Argentine